The Ministry of the Maritime Fleet (Minmorflot) was a government ministry in the Soviet Union.

The Merchant Maritime Fleet of the USSR is abbreviated Morflot. All Soviet merchant fleet organizations and establishments were subordinate to the Ministry of the Maritime Fleet, abbreviated Minmorflot.

History
Until 25 May 1939, functions of the Minmorflot were carried out by the People's Commissariat of Water Transport, which was responsible for both maritime and river fleets.

The structure of the People's Commissariat of Maritime Fleet as a separate people's commissariat was confirmed by a decree of the Council of Ministers on 25 May 1939. On 15 March 1946, the People's Commissariat of the Maritime Fleet was renamed the Ministry of the Maritime Fleet by decree of the Supreme Soviet, along with all the other people's commissariats, which also became ministries.

On March 15, 1953, Minmorflot was united with the Ministry of the River Fleet, becoming the Ministry of the Maritime and River Fleet.

By decree of the Presidium of the Supreme Council dated August 25, 1954, the Ministry of Maritime and River Fleet was re-established on August 25, 1954, when the Ministry of Maritime Fleet and Ministry of River Fleet was redivided.

Minmorflot was liquidated on December 26, 1991 due to the dissolution of the Soviet Union.

Subordinate organizations and establishments

The Ministry of the Maritime Fleet was the head organization of Morflot. The main office of Mimmorflot was in Moscow.

The following establishments were subordinated to Minmorflot in from 1970-1991:

 Sovfraht
Register of the USSR, today Russian Maritime Register of Shipping
 Maritime Container Service (МРФ).
 Merchant Maritime Transport (TMT, Russian: Торговый морской транспорт).
The merchant marine was divided into shipping companies and sea routes. The following subordinate shipping companies to Minmorflot from 1960–1991:
Baltic Sea Shipping Company, Leningrad
Estonian Shipping Company, Tallinn
Latvian Shipping Company, Riga
Lithuanian Shipping Company, Klaypeda
Black Sea Shipping Company, Odessa
Azov Shipping Company, Mariupol
Novorossiysk Shipping Company, Novorossiysk
Georgian Shipping Company, Batumi
Soviet Dunaj Shipping Company or Dunaj-Sea Shipping Company, Izmail
Far East Shipping Company, Vladivostok
PRISCO, Primorie (Seaside) Shipping Company, Nahodka
Sakhalin Shipping Company, Kholmsk
Kamchatska Shipping Company, Petropavlovsk-Kamchatsky
Murmansk Shipping Company, Murmansk
Sevmorput, the organisation controlling the Arctic Northeast Passage Sea route.
SVUMF, the North-Eastern Directorate of the Maritime Fleet.
Caspian Shipping Company, Baku
Central Asian Shipping Company (Aral Sea)

Each Soviet seaport was part of the closest shipping company.

List of Ministers
Ministers of Minmorflot from March 1946 to March 1953:

Ministers of Minmorflot from August, 1954 to December, 1991:

References

Maritime Fleet
Transport organizations based in the Soviet Union
Maritime affairs ministries
Water in the Soviet Union